The 2010 Fifth Third Bank Tennis Championships was a professional men's tennis tournament played on hard court. It was a sixteenth edition of the tournament which was part of the 2010 ATP Challenger Tour. It took place in Lexington, Kentucky, United States, between 19 July and 24 July 2010.

Singles main-draw entrants

Seeds

 Rankings are as of July 12, 2010.

Other entrants
The following players received wildcards into the singles main draw:
  Sekou Bangoura
  Jarmere Jenkins
  Denis Kudla
  Eric Quigley

The following players received entry from the qualifying draw:
  Pierre-Ludovic Duclos
  Gong Maoxin
  Brydan Klein
  Fritz Wolmarans

Champions

Singles

 Carsten Ball defeated  Jesse Levine, 6–4, 7–6(7–1)

Doubles

 Raven Klaasen /  Izak van der Merwe defeated  Kaden Hensel /  Adam Hubble, 5–7, 6–4, [10–7]

References
Official website
ITF Search 

Fifth Third Bank Tennis Championships
2010